The Army Black Knights men's basketball team competes in Division I of the National Collegiate Athletic Association (NCAA), representing United States Military Academy in the Patriot League. Army has played its home games at Christl Arena in  West Point, New York since 1985.

Seasons

References

 
Army Black Knights
Army Black Knights basketball seasons